Padinjaretheruvu is one of the main village of the outskirts of Kottarakkara town, which is  west of Kizhekketheruvu on the National Highway 208 (NH 208), in Kollam District, Kerala state, India.

Politics
Padinjaretheruvu is a part of Kottarakkara Municipality. It is a part of Kottarakkara assembly constituency in Mavelikkara (Lok Sabha constituency). Adv. Aisha Potti is the current MLA of Kottarakkara. Kodikkunnil Suresh is the current member of parliament of Mavelikkara.

Geography
Padinjaretheruvu is one of the main junctions in Kottarakkara-Punalur (or Kottarakkara-Pathanapuram) road.

Demographics
Malayalam is the native language of Parankimamukal.

References

Geography of Kollam district
Villages in Kollam district